91 over 50 is a live album by Australian country music singer Slim Dusty. The album was Dusty's 91st album, recorded over 50 years. It was released in August 1996 and peaked at number 46 on the ARIA Charts.

Dusty said "For Me, each of these great old songs has come to life again, mainly because I had the opportunity to stand up and sing them in a studio environment 'live' feeling the story and seeing them again in my mind as the words and melodies come alive."

Track listing

Charts

Release history

References

Slim Dusty albums
1996 live albums
Live albums by Australian artists
EMI Records albums